In heraldry, sable is the tincture black, and belongs to the class of dark tinctures, called "colours". In engravings and line drawings, it is sometimes depicted as a region of crossed horizontal and vertical lines, or else marked with sa. as an abbreviation.

The name derives from the black fur of the sable, a species of marten.

Poetic meanings
Centuries ago, arms were often described poetically and the tinctures were connected to different gemstones, flowers and heavenly bodies. Sable usually represented the following:
 Of jewels, the diamond
 Of heavenly bodies, Saturn
 Of flowers, the herb nightshade, in these circumstances also called dwal

Gallery

Sable in Central Europe

Sable is considered a colour in British and French heraldry, and contrasts with lighter metals, argent and Or.  However, in the heraldry of Germany, Polish heraldry and other parts of central Europe, sable is not infrequently placed on colour fields. As a result, a sable cross may appear on a red shield, or a sable bird may appear on a blue or a red field, as in the arms of Albania.

In Hungary, for example, one can find examples of sable on gules and azure fields as early as the sixteenth century in the arms of the family Kanizsai (granted in 1519): Azure, an eagle's wing sable taloned Or between a decrescent argent and a sun Or. Another early Hungarian example was granted in 1628 to the family Karomi Bornemisza: Per fess gules, an eagle displayed sable crowned Or, and azure, a buffalo's head cabossed sable maintaining in its mouth a fish (argent?).

Polish examples abound as early as the fifteenth century.  Józef Szymański includes no fewer than seven examples of sable primary charges on either gules or azure fields out of the approximately 200 shields from this period whose blazons are known.  These include the arms of  Corvin, "Azure, a raven sable with a circlet or in its beak"; Kownaty, "Gules, a trumpet sable with a cord or, a Passion cross of the same issuing from its opening"; and Słońce, "Gules, a sphere radiant sable, its centre argent."  In addition to the seven major examples, he describes occasional variants for the arms of some rody which also use sable charges on azure or gules fields.

Sable charges on gules fields also appear in the armory used in Lithuania.  This is not surprising, since a significant fraction of Lithuania's personal coats of arms are of Polish origin, so there is a certain similarity of style.  Among these coats are those of Great Žemaitija: "a black bear with an argent chain on its neck on a field gules."

References

Notes

External links

Colours (heraldry)
Shades of gray
Shades of black